Gash is the debut EP by the neo-psychedelia band Pram. It was released in 1992 on Howl Records.

Originally a six-song album, the EP was re-released in 1997 as a full-length record on the æ label. Five more tracks were added to the release.

Track listing

Personnel 
Rosie Cuckston – vocals
Sam Owen – bass guitar
Phil Savage – production, engineering
Max Simpson – keyboards, sampler
Andy Weir – drums

References

External links 
 

1990 EPs
Pram (band) albums